K. Suresh Kurup (born 25 May 1956) is an Indian politician and a member of the Communist Party of India (Marxist). He was a member of the Kerala Legislative Assembly representing Ettumanoor constituency from 1 June 2011 to 24 May 2021.

He was a member of the 8th, 12th, 13th and 14th Lok Sabha from Kottayam constituency of Kerala.

Personal life
K. Suresh Kurup was born on 25 May 1956 as the son of Kunjan Pillai and Bharathy Amma at Kottayam in the erstwhile State of Travancore–Cochin.

He was educated at CMS College in Kottayam, NSS Hindu College, Changanassery and The Kerala Law Academy Law College, Thiruvananthapuram. He has  B.A and LL.B degrees and has practised as a lawyer.

He is married to Savithry Nampoothiri 
and has two sons.

Political career 
Kurup was chairman of the Kerala University Students Union in 1978-1979 and president of the state branch of the Students Federation of India between 1982 and 1985.

In 1984, Kurup was elected to the 8th Lok Sabha. He was elected to the 12th Lok Sabha in 1998 and to the 13th Lok Sabha in 1999, as well as to the 14th Lok Sabha in 2004.

Kurup won the Ettumanoor constituency in the elections for the Legislative Assembly of Kerala in 2011 and 2016.

References 

Communist Party of India (Marxist) politicians from Kerala
Living people
1956 births
India MPs 1984–1989
India MPs 1998–1999
India MPs 1999–2004
India MPs 2004–2009
Lok Sabha members from Kerala
Politicians from Kottayam
Kerala MLAs 2011–2016
Kerala MLAs 2016–2021